{{DISPLAYTITLE:C9H12O3}}
The molecular formula C9H12O3 (molar mass: 168.19 g/mol, exact mass: 168.078 u) may refer to:

 Homovanillyl alcohol
 4-Ipomeanol (4-IPO)
 Veratrole alcohol

Molecular formulas